Genovese basil (in Ligurian language baxaicò or baxeicò) is a cultivar of Ocimum basilicum (sweet basil). It is one of the most popular basils for culinary use, particularly for its use in pesto, the traditional Genoese sauce. 
The name "Basilico Genovese" is protected by the European Union with the Denominazione di Origine Protetta certification. Genoese basil is produced in the provinces of Genoa, Savona and Imperia.

The best genoese basil is said to be grown in Prà, a western delegation of the city of Genoa. The nearby presence of a large steel mill from the 1950s to the 1980s threatened the cultivar, said to be necessary to produce the "real" genoese pesto. Now the threat is mostly gone with the dismissal of the mill and the conversion of the remaining lines to less polluting productions.

Nomenclature and Taxonomy

References

See also 
 International Code of Nomenclature for Cultivated Plants

Ocimum
Herbs
Italian products with protected designation of origin